The Tarnak River is a river of Ghazni, Zabul and Kandahar provinces of Afghanistan. It rises in Hazarajat, near  , south of the Lomar Pass.

Rivers of Afghanistan
Helmand River drainage basin
Landforms of Ghazni Province
Landforms of Zabul Province
Landforms of Kandahar Province